Andrey Ivanovich Denyer, born Heinrich Johann Denier (Russian: Андрей Иванович Деньер; 1820, Mogilev - 3 March 1892, St. Petersburg) was a Russian portrait photographer and artist.

Biography 
He was born to an immigrant family from Switzerland. After completing his primary education in Mogilev, he enrolled at the Imperial Academy of Fine Arts, where he studied history painting under the tutelage of Karl Bryullov. During those years, he also developed an interest in the new art of photography.

In 1849, he graduated from the Acaademy. Two years later, he opened his own small daguerreotype studio, although he was already using with glass plates. In 1854, he was able to move  to a larger studio on Nevsky Prospect. He advertised it as an "artist's studio", in an effort to stand out from his competition, experimenting with watercolor enhanced photographs, and was one of the first photographers in Russia to use the collodion process. 

In 1860, he was awarded the title "Photographer of Their Imperial Majesties", which allowed him to place the state emblem on his signboard. Three years later, he moved to an even larger studio, which he would operate until his death. During this time, he began participating in numerous national and international exhibitions. In 1865, he was elected a member of the Société française de photographie. The catalogue of the works he presented at the Exposition Universelle (1867) noted that his workshop had eighteen employees.

During the 1870s, he had several showings in London.

He retired in 1890. That same year, he became a Russian citizen. He died two years later, aged seventy-two, and was interred at Volkovo Cemetery.

Selected portraits

References

External links 

 Андрей "Деньер — художник и фотограф" Biography at Kino Portret
 "Андрей (Генрих) Иванович Деньер" Biography @ Photographer.ru

1820 births
1892 deaths
Russian photographers
Russian people of Swiss descent
Portrait photographers
People from Mogilev